The 2004 CAF Champions League Final was the final of the 2004 CAF Champions League.

It was a football tie held over two legs in December 2004 between Étoile du Sahel of Tunisia, and  Enyimba of Nigeria.

Qualified teams
In the following table, finals until 1996 were in the African Cup of Champions Club era, since 1997 were in the CAF Champions League era.

Venues

Stade Olympique de Sousse

Stade olympique de Sousse is a multi-purpose stadium in Sousse, Tunisia.  It is used by the football team Étoile du Sahel, and was used for the 2004 African Cup of Nations.  The stadium holds 28,000 people.
It hosts within it the meetings played by the football team of the city: Étoile sportive du Sahel (ESS). 

For many decades, Sousse footballers knew only the clay surfaces and knew the turf surfaces only when the stadium was inaugurated with an initial capacity of 10,000 places.
It passes over the years to 15,000 seats and is then expanded again on the occasion of the 1994 African Cup of Nations with 6,000 additional seats to reach a capacity of 21,000 seats; A luminous panel is installed at the same time. 
The last expansion was carried out in 1999 to bring the capacity of the stadium to 28,000 seats for the 2001 Mediterranean Games, a reorganization of the gallery of honor was carried out, from a capacity of 70 to 217 places.

It hosted 1977 FIFA World Youth Championship, 1994 African Cup of Nations, 2001 Mediterranean Games and 2004 African Cup of Nations.

Abuja National Stadium

Abuja National Stadium, Abuja is a multipurpose national sports stadium located in Abuja, in the Federal Capital Territory of Nigeria. The stadium serves as a home to the Nigerian national football team, as well as a center for various social, cultural, and religious events. The Federal Government of Nigeria approved the contract for the construction of the National Stadium complex and Games Village on 18 July 2000. The stadium was constructed to host the 8th All Africa Games which took place in October 2003.

In fact, CAF refused to hold the match in the city of Aba, the stronghold of Enyimba, because it did not comply with the CAF standards adopted for the stadiums. Enyimba announced that the African Champions League final will be played in the National Stadium of Lagos, but the Confederation of African Football has announced the transfer of the match from Lagos to the Nigerian capital Abuja.

Road to final

Format
The final was decided over two legs, with aggregate goals used to determine the winner. If the sides were level on aggregate after the second leg, the away goals rule would have been applied, and if still level, the tie would have proceeded directly to a penalty shootout (no extra time is played).

Matches

First leg

Second leg

Notes and references

External links
2004 CAF Champions League - cafonline.com

Final
2004
1
Enyimba FC matches
2004–05 in Tunisian football
2004–05 in Nigerian football
CAF Champions League Final 2004